The 14th Pan American Games were held in Santo Domingo, Dominican Republic from August 1 to August 17, 2003.

Medals

Silver

Women's 200 metres: Cydonie Mothersille

Results by event

Swimming

Women's Competition

See also
Cayman Islands at the 2002 Commonwealth Games
Cayman Islands at the 2004 Summer Olympics

References

Nations at the 2003 Pan American Games
Pan American Games
2003